Ian Gilmour is a New Zealand-born actor and director who has worked mostly in Australia.

Television roles
He has acted in several Australian television series, most notably as Kevin Burns in Prisoner in 1980. Other credits include The Box, Chopper Squad, Kingswood Country, Waterloo Station, A Country Practice and The Flying Doctors.

Film roles
Film credits include: The Chant of Jimmie Blacksmith, The Odd Angry Shot, Silver City, The Coca-Cola Kid, Malpractice and A Cry in the Dark.

Directing
He subsequently moved away from acting to become a director. His directorial credits in television include: The Flying Doctors, Heartbreak High, Water Rats, McLeod's Daughters and Home and Away.

He made a film in 2006 called Magma: Volcanic Disaster about a volcanic disaster.

Personal life
Gilmour lives in Sydney, Australia with his wife and son.

References

External links
 

1955 births
Living people
New Zealand male film actors
New Zealand male soap opera actors
New Zealand male television actors
Australian male film actors
Australian male soap opera actors
Australian television directors
Gilmour,Ian
20th-century New Zealand male actors
20th-century Australian male actors
21st-century New Zealand male actors
21st-century Australian male actors